Roger William Clift (1931–1971) was an Australian rules footballer for the Port Adelaide during the 1950s. He was part of four of the club's six premierships in a row and won the club's best and fairest in the first of those in 1954. Football historian John Devaney describes Roger Clift as "One of those players who seems blessed with a total disregard for personal safety". Clift died of a heart attack at a young age, while playing squash. He is interred at the 	
Centennial Park Cemetery in Pasadena, South Australia.

References

1931 births
1971 deaths
Australian rules footballers from South Australia
People from Jamestown, South Australia
Port Adelaide Football Club (SANFL) players
Port Adelaide Football Club players (all competitions)
Sport deaths in Australia